Eric Evan Paterson (September 11, 1929 – January 14, 2014) was a Canadian ice hockey player. He was a member of the Edmonton Mercurys that won a gold medal at the 1952 Winter Olympics in Oslo, Norway.

References

External links
bio

1929 births
2014 deaths
Canadian ice hockey goaltenders
Ice hockey players at the 1952 Winter Olympics
Medalists at the 1952 Winter Olympics
Olympic gold medalists for Canada
Olympic ice hockey players of Canada
Olympic medalists in ice hockey
Ice hockey people from Edmonton